Borowicz is a Polish surname. Notable people include:

 Germano Borovicz Cardoso Schweger (born 1981), Brazilian footballer
 Katarzyna Borowicz (born 1985), Polish beauty queen
 Krystyna Borowicz (1923–2009), Polish actress
 Monika Borowicz (born 1982), Polish canoer
 Stephanie Borowicz (born c. 1977), American politician, member of the Pennsylvania House of Representatives

Polish-language surnames